Abu Bakr II ibn Abd al-Munan was the emir of Harar (1829-1852). He was the son of Abd al-Mannan, the nephew of Abd ar-Rahman ibn Muhammad, and the husband of Gisti (Harari "princess") Fatima, Abd ar-Rahman's oldest daughter. He succeeded to the throne of Harar upon the death of Abd ar-Rahman. 

For a number of years in the 1830s, Abu Bakr campaigned against the neighboring Oromo with an armed force which the British explorer W. C. Barker described as "consisting of from 150 to 200 matchlock men, 100 cavalry armed with long spears, 60 spearmen on foot, and a few archers. Insignificant, however, as this force really is, the matchlockmen alone render it far superior to that of the neighbouring tribes, who have a great dread of fire-arms; they have not even a single matchlock in their possession." Despite his military successes, by 1840 Harari merchants lamented that the neighboring Oromo were devastating the neighboring villages. The Harari were attacked in their fields within sight of the city walls in the middle of the day, and the city was spared in the end only by paying tribute. 

Burton alludes to the existence of communications between Emir Abu Bakr and the British governor of Aden. At the same time, there was tension between Harar and Hajj Sharmakay, ruler of Zeila; in response to the Emir's imprisonment of his agent in Harar, Hajj Sharmakay persuaded the son of Sahle Selassie, ruler of Shewa, to imprison about 300 citizens of Harar then resident in Shewa.

Burton also mentions that Abu Bakr's vizier, or chief minister, was the treacherous Gerad Mohammed, who also served his son Ahmad. Burton had been told that, before his death, Abu Bakr had warned his son about the man.

He died on 8 July 1852 and was succeeded by his son Ahmad, who initially ruled under the regency of his mother Gisti Fatima, who was popular with the people of Harar.

See also
List of emirs of Harar
Emirate of Harar
Sharmarke Ali Saleh

Notes 

1852 deaths
Emirs of Harar
Year of birth missing